Sophie Edwards (born 25 February 2000) is an Australian track and road cyclist.

Edwards set a new Australian record in the individual pursuit at the Junior Track World Championships in 2018. Edwards was a gold medalist at the 2022 Commonwealth Games in the  Women’s Team Pursuit competition.

References

 

2000 births
Living people
Australian female cyclists
Australian track cyclists
21st-century Australian people
Cyclists at the 2022 Commonwealth Games
Commonwealth Games gold medallists for Australia
21st-century Australian women
Commonwealth Games medallists in cycling
Medallists at the 2022 Commonwealth Games